Gaizka is a male given name of Basque origin, meaning saviour and therefore similar to the (Castilian) Spanish name Salvador or Jesús (The Saviour). Notable people with the name include:

Given name
Gaizka Ayesa (born 2001), Spanish footballer
Gaizka Bergara, (born 1986), Spanish footballer
Gaizka Campos (born 1997), Spanish footballer
 (born 1981), Spanish historian
Gaizka Garitano (born 1975), Spanish footballer and coach
Gaizka Larrazabal (born 1997), Spanish footballer
 (born 1978), Spanish cyclist
Gaizka Mendieta (born 1974), Spanish footballer
Gaizka Saizar (born 1980), Spanish footballer
Gaizka Toquero (born 1984), Spanish footballer
 (born 1967), Spanish screenwriter/director

References

Basque masculine given names